"You're the One" is a song by British singer and songwriter Charli XCX, released as her fifth single on 14 June 2012 exclusively in Australia under Warner Music, and the third single from her debut EP of the same name, and her major-label debut studio album True Romance (2013).

Background 
Charli XCX wrote the song while working in Sweden. Producer Patrik Berger sent her two beats, one of which became Icona Pop's "I Love It" and the other of which became "You're the One". Having just fallen in love, Charli wrote the song to be "about super amazing orgasmic love". The song first appeared in 2011 under the title "In the Dark", in a demo form on the official promotional album sampler of True Romance. When performed for Gigwise in May 2012, it appeared under a second title "Dancing in the Dark". A CD single was released for promotional purposes in a cardboard sleeve.

Critical reception 
B. David Zarley from The Line of Best Fit praised the song, describing it as "goth pop combines pop song craft and approachability with a drenching layer of dark luxuriousness", and said it "shifts from clipped vocals and pallbearer shuffling verses to a lofting, romantic hook; the entire thing is a microcosm of the microgenre, vivisected and labelled and easily consumable." John Murphy from musicOMH said the song "will threaten to take up residence in your brain for months on end", and described it as "an [excellent] real pop nugget". Billboard placed "You're the One" 16th on its list of the best songs of 2012, commenting that Charli XCX "released a string of dazzle pop singles this year, none quite as fluttering as this synth-laden love song."

Music video 

The video for "You're the One" was uploaded to Charli XCX's official YouTube channel on July 3, 2012. It was directed by Dawn Shadforth. The video switches between three different scenes: Charli and an army of children in a warehouse, featuring a large "XCX" on the wall; Charli in a room featuring red light-up hearts and heart-shaped balloons; and Charli performing on a small stage in front of a cloudy backdrop.

Odd Future's The Internet Remix video 

A video was also made for the remix by The Internet (credited as Odd Future's The Internet) featuring Mike G, which appeared on the You're the One EP. It features short, brightly-colored clips of Charli in the style of GIF images.

The video was directed by Claire Boyd and Ryan Andrews. Andrews has directed the music videos for several of Charli's tracks, including "Cloud Aura" and "So Far Away". He explained that his work with Charli uses a visual style that represents how she "developed herself through Twitter and Tumblr".

Track listing
CD single / Digital download
"You're the One" – 3:15

Credits and personnel
 Lead vocals – Charli XCX
Producer – Patrik Berger
Sound Mixers – Rich Costley
Lyrics – Charlotte Aitchison, Patrik Berger

Charts

You're the One (EP) 
You're the One (EP) is the first extended play by English recording artist Charli XCX. Three versions of the EP were released with varying track lists. The EP includes Charli XCX's two singles released exclusively in the UK in 2011; "Stay Away" and "Nuclear Seasons". Preceding the album's release in Australia, the title track was released digitally as the EP's lead single in that territory.

Track listing

Release history

References

2012 songs
2012 singles
Charli XCX songs
Songs written by Charli XCX
Songs written by Patrik Berger (record producer)
Song recordings produced by Ariel Rechtshaid